Mahlon S. Priest (born March 18, 1950) is an American politician of the Republican Party. Priest was the first elected mayor of Federal Way, Washington, serving from 2010 to 2014. Earlier he served four terms in the Washington House of Representatives representing Washington's 30th legislative district and six years on the Federal Way City Council.

Personal
After being defeated for a second term, Skip Priest retired to Idaho with his wife (Trisha Bennett).

Public and community service
Former Representative Priest is served three  terms.  Elected as a Republican, he represented the 30th Legislative District.  Prior to serving in the House of Representatives, he was Mayor of Federal Way and Chair of the City Council's Land Use and Transportation Committee. Other activities include:

Board Member: Pacific Harbors Council B.S.A.
Silver Beaver Award
Board Member: Federal Way Kiwanis
Hixson Fellowship
Advisory Board Member: The Friends of the Hylebos
Board Member: Federal Way Chamber Advancing Leadership Program
Board Member: South King County Multi-Service Center
Member: Federal Way School District Construction Oversight Committee

References

Willamette University alumni
Republican Party members of the Washington House of Representatives
People from Federal Way, Washington
Living people
1950 births